Younn Zahary (born 20 October 1998) is a professional footballer who plays as a defender for Hungarian club Mezőkövesd. Born in France, Zahary represents the Comoros national team.

Club career
Zahary made his debut for Stade Malherbe Caen in a 2–2 Ligue 1 tie with Strasbourg on 9 December 2018. He signed his first professional contract with the club on 14 February 2019.

In January 2020 Zahary joined Pau FC on loan until the end of the 2020–21 season.

On 29 June 2021, he moved to Cholet.

On 18 January 2023, Zahary signed with Mezőkövesd in Hungary.

International career
Zahary was born in France and is of Comorian descent. He represented the Comoros national team in a 1–0 friendly win over Guinea on 12 October 2019.

References

External links
 
 Stade Malherbe Caen Profile
 

1998 births
Footballers from Nantes
French sportspeople of Comorian descent
Living people
French footballers
Comorian footballers
Comoros international footballers
Association football defenders
Stade Malherbe Caen players
Pau FC players
SO Cholet players
Mezőkövesdi SE footballers
Ligue 1 players
Ligue 2 players
Championnat National players
Championnat National 3 players
2021 Africa Cup of Nations players
Nemzeti Bajnokság I players
French expatriate footballers
Comorian expatriate footballers
Expatriate footballers in Hungary
French expatriate sportspeople in Hungary
Comorian expatriate sportspeople in Hungary